Lykke's Cabinet was the government of Norway from 5 March 1926 to 28 January 1928. The cabinet was led by Ivar Lykke and was a coalition between the Conservative and Free-minded Liberal Party. It had the following composition:

Cabinet members

|}

Secretary to the Council of State
Nicolai Franciscus Leganger

References
Ivar Lykke's Government. 5 March 1926 - 28 January 1928 - Government.no

Notes

Lykke
Lykke
Lykke
1926 establishments in Norway
1928 disestablishments in Norway
Cabinets established in 1926
Cabinets disestablished in 1928